Polyptychus thihongae is a moth of the  family Sphingidae. It is known from Gabon and the Central African Republic.

References

Polyptychus
Moths described in 1970
Insects of Cameroon
Fauna of the Central African Republic
Fauna of the Republic of the Congo
Fauna of Gabon
Moths of Africa